Edmund Sobkowiak (25 January 1914 – 11 May 1988) was a Polish boxer who competed in the 1936 Summer Olympics.

He was born in Poznań.

In 1936 he was eliminated in the quarterfinals of the flyweight class after losing his fight to eventual bronze medalist Louis Laurie.

External links
  (archive)
 
 
 

1914 births
1988 deaths
Sportspeople from Poznań
Flyweight boxers
Olympic boxers of Poland
Boxers at the 1936 Summer Olympics
Polish male boxers